The Girls Singles tournament of the 2012 BWF World Junior Championships was held from October 30 until November 3. The defending champion, Ratchanok Intanon, who won the tournament for 3 years in a row decided not to take part this time even though her age was still eligible.

Japanese girl Nozomi Okuhara, who was beaten by Intanon in the semi final of the previous year's tournament, won the all-Japanese final against her teammate Akane Yamaguchi 21-12, 21-9.

Seeded

  Tai Tzu-ying (quarter-final)
  Busanan Ongbamrungphan (quarter-final)
  Nozomi Okuhara (champion)
  Neslihan Yiğit (third round)
  Sun Yu (semi-final)
  Iris Wang (third round)
  Stefani Stoeva (fourth round)
  Line Kjærsfeldt (third round)
  Liang Xiaoyu (third round)
  Kim Hyo-min (fourth round)
  Sandra-Maria Jensen (third round)
  Lucie Černá (third round)
  Hanna Ramadhini (quarter-final)
  Akane Yamaguchi (final)
  Christin Tsai (fourth round)
  Evgeniya Kosetskaya (third round)

Draw

Finals

Top Half

Section 1

Section 2

Section 3

Section 4

Bottom Half

Section 5

Section 6

Section 7

Section 8

References
Main Draw (Archived 2013-07-13)

2012 BWF World Junior Championships
2012 in youth sport